The Purple Dawn is a 1923 American silent romantic drama film that was produced, written, and directed by Charles R. Seeling. It stars Bessie Love, Bert Sprotte, and William E. Aldrich.

The film is presumed lost.

Plot 
In San Francisco's Chinatown, Mui Far (Love), a Chinese American girl, falls in love with a young white sailor (Aldrich), who is robbed when he attempts to deliver a package of opium. The sailor meets a white girl in the country, and falls in love with her. The original owners of the opium think that the sailor stole the opium, and kidnap him and his new sweetheart. Mui Far is heartbroken, but rescues the sailor and his new sweetheart. She then commits suicide by walking into San Francisco Bay at dawn.

Cast

Production 
Per the film's title, the final 100 feet of film were tinted light purple for dramatic effect.

Reception 
The film received good reviews, although the scene where the hero receives a beating was deemed "far too brutal to please the eye." Bessie Love's performance received positive reviews.

See also 
 Examples of yellowface
 Racism in early American film
 Whitewashing in film

References 
Notes

Citations

Works cited

External links 
 
 
 
 

1923 lost films
1923 romantic drama films
1923 films
American black-and-white films
American romantic drama films
American silent feature films
Chinatown, San Francisco in fiction
Films directed by Charles R. Seeling
Films set in San Francisco
Lost American films
Lost romantic drama films
1920s American films
Silent romantic drama films
Silent American drama films